The 1968 New Zealand gallantry awards were announced via two Special Honours Lists dated 23 September and 8 October 1968, and recognised 14 New Zealand military personnel for gallantry and distinguished service in Malaysia and during operations in Vietnam.

For actions in Malaysia

Queen's Commendation for Brave Conduct
 Private Kevin James Smallridge – Royal New Zealand Infantry Regiment (Regular Force).

For actions in Vietnam

Order of the British Empire

Member (MBE)
Military division, additional
 Major John Airth Mace – Royal New Zealand Infantry Regiment.
 Major Thomas Gerald Martin – Royal Regiment of New Zealand Artillery.

Military Cross (MC)
 Lieutenant Maurice Francis Dodson – Royal New Zealand Infantry Regiment (Regular Force); of Christchurch
 Captain Anthony George Howell – Royal New Zealand Zealand Infantry Regiment.
 Major Brian Thomas Albert Worsnop – Royal New Zealand Infantry Regiment.

Distinguished Conduct Medal (DCM)
 Driver Ronald James Prichard – Royal New Zealand Army Service Corps.

Mentioned in despatches
 Corporal Hukarere Mamaeroa Bristowe – Royal New Zealand Infantry Regiment.
 Driver Richard Dick Dargaville – Royal New Zealand Army Service Corps.
 Captain and Quartermaster David Ralph Hughes – Royal New Zealand Army Ordnance Corps.
 Captain Russell James Martin – Royal Regiment of New Zealand Artillery.
 Sergeant John Russell Whitworth – Royal New Zealand Infantry Regiment.
 Corporal Howard Owen Wilson – Royal New Zealand Infantry Regiment.

Queen's Commendation for Brave Conduct
 Lance Bombardier Bruce Allan Wynyard – Royal Regiment of New Zealand Artillery (Regular Force).

References

Gallantry awards
New Zealand gallantry awards